Aedes (Paraedes) ostentatio is a species complex of zoophilic mosquito belonging to the genus Aedes. It is found in Sri Lanka, Malay, India, Indochina, Indonesia, Philippines, Laos, Thailand, Vietnam and Maluku.

References

External links
A note on the occurrence of Aedes (Paraedes) ostentatio (Leicester) in Dibrugarh District, Assam, India (Diptera: Culicidae)
DESCRIPTION OF THE FEMALE, PUPA, AND LARVA OF AEDES (PARAEDES) BARRAUDI AND THE PUPA AND LARVA OF AEDES (PARAEDES) MENONZ (DIPTERA: CULICIDAE)
Paraedes Edwards, 1934 - Mosquito Taxonomic Inventory

ostentatio
Insects described in 1908